Dario Dainelli (born 9 June 1979) is an Italian former professional footballer who played as a defender.

Club career

Early career
Born in Pontedera, Province of Pisa, Dainelli started his professional career at Empoli. He spent his early years on loan at Modena (Serie C1), Cavese (Serie C2) and Fidelis Andria (Serie C1).

He was signed by Lecce in 2000 in a co-ownership deal and made his Serie A debut against Roma on 18 February 2001.

Brescia
After just one season at Lecce, he re-signed for Empoli before moving to Brescia.

Except for the first season which he just made five appearances and left on loan to Serie A rival Verona, he made 56 appearances more for Brescia.

Fiorentina
In July 2004, Dainelli signed for newly promoted team Fiorentina, in a co-ownership deal with Brescia. In January 2005, Fiorentina immediately bought all of the remain registration rights.

Dainelli was the team captain after Christian Riganò left the club in summer 2005, a position which he hold until his transfer to Genoa.

At the end of 2006–07 season, due to his contract expiring on summer, some rumor linked him with Juventus and other Italian clubs, but on 9 June 2007, he finally signed a new four-year contract extension with Fiorentina.

In summer 2009, ACF Fiorentina prepared to sell the captain by signing Cesare Natali in order to increase the depth of the bench. Alessandro Gamberini, Per Krøldrup and Dainelli rotated at the starting pair of the central defender.

Genoa
After the signing of Felipe, on 12 January 2010 Dainelli was transferred to Genoa with whom he signed a contract which lasted until June 2013.

Chievo
On 31 January 2012, the last day of 2011–12 winter transfer window, Dainelli moved to the fellow league club Chievo Verona on a loan deal. He returned to Genoa after the loan deal expired at 30 June 2012 and then terminated his contract with Genoa. On 7 August 2012, he agreed a permanent deal with Chievo.

Livorno
On 16 July 2018, Dainelli signed with Livorno. On 13 May 2019, he announced his retirement.

International career
Dainelli played once for Italy U21 team, on 16 April 2002. a friendly 2–3 loss to France U21.

He was also called up to 2002 UEFA European Under-21 Football Championship, but did not play.

Dainelli made his debut for the Italy national team against Ecuador on 11 June 2005 a friendly match which ended in a 1–1 draw.

He was recalled by new Italian head coach Roberto Donadoni to play in Euro 2008 qualifying against Lithuania and France on 2 September 2006 and 6 September 2006, but did make an appearance.

Career statistics

Club

International

References

External links
 Dario Dainelli Profile at FootballDatabase
 FIGC 

1979 births
Living people
Sportspeople from the Province of Pisa
Association football central defenders
Italian footballers
Empoli F.C. players
Modena F.C. players
Cavese 1919 players
S.S. Fidelis Andria 1928 players
U.S. Lecce players
Brescia Calcio players
ACF Fiorentina players
Hellas Verona F.C. players
Genoa C.F.C. players
Serie A players
Serie B players
Serie C players
A.C. ChievoVerona players
U.S. Livorno 1915 players
Italy international footballers
Italy under-21 international footballers
Footballers from Tuscany